Tuputupu -‘o-Pulotu Vaea, The Honourable Baroness Tuputupu ‘o Pulotu Vaea of Houma (née Ma'afu-'o-Tukuialahi; 14 October 1928 – 29 July 2021) was a Tongan noblewoman and royal. Vaea and her late husband, former Prime Minister of Tonga Baron Vaea (1921–2009), are the parents of the present Queen of Tonga, Queen Nanasipau'u. She was the mother-in-law of the present King of Tonga, Tupou VI.

She was the eldest daughter of Siosaia Lausi’i, 7th Ma’afu-’o- Tukui’aulahi, of Vaini and his wife, ’Anaukihesina Lamipeti.

The baroness and her late husband, Baron Vaea, had seven children and one adopted daughter: Queen Nanasipauʻu Tukuʻaho, 'Alipate Tu'ivanuavou Vaea, 'Amelia Luoluafetu'u Vaea, Luseane Luani (Dowager Lady Luani) and Cassandra Vaea (formerly Tuipelehake). Two sons, Moimoikimofuta Kaifahina Vaea, Ratu Edward Vaea, are deceased.

Family tree

References

1928 births
2021 deaths
Tongan nobles
Tongan women
Spouses of prime ministers of Tonga
People from Tongatapu
20th-century Tongan women
21st-century Tongan women
20th-century Tongan people
21st-century Tongan people